In Italy, an arengario (also spelled arrengario or arengo; pl.: arengari, arrengari, arenghi) is a government building in various historic periods. The word comes from the verb "arringare" ("to address"), as arengari usually have balconies from which the authorities would address the population in public speeches.

It was originally the town hall of Italian medieval communes, especially in Northern Italy. Under Fascism, it was also local governments seats, such as the seat of the podestà (mayor). As a consequence, a number of both medieval and modern (Fascist) buildings in different Italian cities are known as "Arengario". Notable arengari include:

 the medieval Arengario of Monza
 the medieval Arengario of Brescia
 the Fascist Arengario of Milan

See also
 "Broletto" (has a partially overlapping meaning)

Footnotes

Italian language
Architecture in Italy